David Oliver Whilldin (April 8, 1881 – January 18, 1970) was an architect in Alabama. Several of the buildings he designed are listed on the National Register of Historic Places, including his office building the Whilldin Building. His designs include Legion Field and schools in the Birmingham City Schools district.

Whilldin was born in Philadelphia. He studied at Drexel Institute and the University of Pennsylvania.

He retired in 1962.

A pen and ink drawing he did of Independence Hall in Philadelphia is in the Birmingham Museum of Art's collection.

Works
Old Ensley High School building (1908)
 National Bank of Attalla (1913) in Etowah County, Alabama on the corner of North Third Street and 5th Avenue
Gadsden Country Club (1919)
Hueytown High School (1921)
Whilldin Building (1924), Birmingham, Alabama, NRHP-listed
West End Masonic Temple (1926), Birmingham, Alabama, NRHP-listed
Legion Field (1927) 
Thomas Jefferson Hotel (1929)
West End High School (Birmingham, Alabama) (1930) with Warren, Knight and Davis
Pizitz Department Store (1930) at 311 Broad Street in Gadsden
Bama Theatre (1937), Tuscaloosa, Alabama, NRHP-listed
Reich Hotel in Gadsden, Alabama
Pitman Theatre in Gadsden, Alabama
Several elementary schools in Gadsden and a junior high school
Tuscaloosa City Hall
Dr. Pepper Syrup Plant, Birmingham, Alabama, NRHP-listed
Ideal Department Store Building, Birmingham, Alabama, NRHP-listed
Pratt School, Birmingham, Alabama, NRHP-listed
American National Bank in Gadsden
One or more works in Birmingham-Southern College, Birmingham, Alabama, NRHP-listed
One or more works in Anderson Place Historic District, Birmingham, NRHP-listed
One or more works in Woodlawn Highlands Historic District, Birmingham, Alabama, NRHP-listed

References

1881 births
1970 deaths
20th-century American architects
Architects from Philadelphia
Architects from Alabama
People from Birmingham, Alabama
Drexel University alumni
University of Pennsylvania alumni